The World Group Play-offs were the main play-offs of 2003 Davis Cup. Winners advanced to the World Group, and losers were relegated in the Zonal Regions I.

Teams
Bold indicates team has qualified for the 2004 Davis Cup World Group.

 From World Group

 From Americas Group I

 From Asia/Oceania Group I

 From Europe/Africa Group I

Results

Seeded teams
 
 
 
 
 
 
 
 

Unseeded teams

 
 
 
 
 
  
 
 

Playoff results

Austria vs. Belgium

Canada vs. Brazil

Thailand vs. Czech Republic

Germany vs. Belarus

Morocco vs. Great Britain

Netherlands vs. India

Ecuador vs. Romania

Slovakia vs. United States

References

World Group Play-offs